The League Championship Series (LCS) is the top level of professional League of Legends in the United States and Canada. The esports league is run by Riot Games and has ten franchise teams. Each annual season of competition is divided into two splits, spring and summer, which conclude with a double-elimination tournament between the top eight teams. At the end of the season, the winner, runners-up and third-place team of the summer playoffs qualify for the annual League of Legends World Championship.

With the exception of some touring events, all games of the LCS are played live at the Riot Games Arena in Los Angeles, California. In addition to a small studio audience, all games are streamed live in several languages on Twitch and YouTube, with broadcasts regularly attracting over 300,000 viewers. The U.S. government grants athlete visas for foreign LCS competitors. The first LCS player to be awarded a P visa was Danny "Shiphtur" Le.

The LCS has attracted sponsorships from Acer, Coca-Cola, and American Express. "League of Legends Championship Series" is a Delaware limited liability company.

History

Origins and history

Riot Games launched League of Legends in October 2009 and rapidly attracted attention from the competitive gaming community. The first two seasons of competitive play consisted of a series of tournaments mostly organised by third parties, such as Intel Extreme Masters in Europe and Major League Gaming in North America, capped by a world championship tournament hosted by Riot Games.

Riot Games announced the formation of the LCS on August 6, 2012, creating a fully professional league run by the company with a regular schedule and guaranteed salaries for players, featuring eight teams in both North America and Europe. Since the LCS was only launched in the third year of professional play, it was immediately dubbed "Season 3". The top three finishers in both the Riot Games European and North American regional championships held in August 2012 automatically qualified, with the remaining five teams being decided in qualifier tournaments held in January 2013. Each LCS season is divided into two splits for spring and summer; the first games of the first spring split took place on February 7, 2013, in North America and on February 9, 2013, in Europe. As of 2020 Counter Logic Gaming, Team SoloMid, and Team Liquid (originally founded as Team Curse) are the sole remaining teams from the first split of the NA LCS, having never been relegated. However, another mainstay, Cloud9 joined in the following Summer split.

Season 3 of the LCS finished with the summer split playoffs, held on August 23 to 25 in Europe at the Gamescom in 2013, which was held in the Koelnmesse in Cologne, North Rine-Westphalia, Germany, and August 30 to September 1, 2013, at PAX Prime 2013 in Seattle, Washington in North America. In Europe, the Fnatic finished first, Lemondogs second, and Gambit Gaming third. In North America, the top three finishers were Cloud9, Team SoloMid, and Team Vulcun. The top three teams from each continent advanced to the Season 3 World Championships.

Riot Games changed naming conventions in 2014, calling the season the "2014 Season" instead of "Season 4". This year League of Legends Challenger Series was also created as a second tier of competition for promotion and relegation.

At the end of the 2014 season, an expansion tournament was held in both Europe and North America that added two teams in region, giving the LCS a total of 10 teams per region for the start of the 2015 Season. Additionally, Riot introduced the concept of "Championship points", which teams would earn based on performance across both splits and playoffs in order to qualify for the World Championship.

A new sale of sponsorship rule was instated for the 2015 season. As a result, several teams were forced to rebrand and leave their respective parent organizations. Europe's Alliance and North America's Evil Geniuses are both owned by GoodGame Inc. CEO Alex Garfield, and thus their League of Legends teams left and became Elements and Winterfox, respectively. Curse Inc. could no longer sponsor LCS team Team Curse, thus the entire esports organization merged into Team Liquid. Additionally the number of teams was expanded from 8 to 10.

In late 2018, the European League of Legends Championship Series (EU LCS) was renamed to the League of Legends European Championship (LEC) and the North American League of Legends Championship Series (NA LCS) dropped "North American" from its name.

In 2021, the league rebranded into the League Championship Series, featuring a refreshed visual identity. Two new mottos were introduced; Made by many and All for the game.

In 2022, the LCS released a celebratory top ten list in which Bjergsen was voted (by current and former LCS players) the best player in LCS history.

Franchising

Starting in 2018, the North American LCS became franchised to encourage long-term investments from owners. This allowed the league to implement revenue sharing, leading to a better foundation for both the teams and professional players. Lastly, the professional players were given a larger voice and more protection within the league.

The buy-in price for the league was $10 million for existing League of Legends teams, who had previously participated in the League Championship Series or Challenger Series. New teams would be subject to an additional $3 million (a total $13 million), which was distributed to the teams that were replaced in the league. Interested parties were given applications in June, due on July 28, 2017. Over 100 existing esports organizations, traditional sports teams, venture capitalists and entrepreneurs reportedly applied. Those applications were then narrowed down to a shortlist, nicknamed "phase two", which saw participants travel to Riot Games' Los Angeles office to interview and review their applications. Riot Games and the North American League Championship Series players' association also decided that league would not expand and instead remain at 10 teams.

Buyers for the league were decided in mid-October. Several existing teams from the league — including Cloud9, Counter Logic Gaming, Echo Fox, FlyQuest, Team Liquid and Team SoloMid — were accepted back into the league. Other existing teams, such as Immortals, Phoenix1, Team Dignitas and Team EnvyUs, were declined from entry into the restructured league. The team welcomed four new teams — one endemic esports team and three NBA franchises or affiliates. Longtime esports organization OpTic Gaming was reportedly awarded a spot in the league after receiving investment from Texas Rangers co-owner Neil Leibman. The other three new spots went to Golden State Warriors co-owner Joe Lacob and his son Kirk as the Golden Guardians, the Cleveland Cavaliers and affiliated venture capital firms as 100 Thieves, and the Houston Rockets as Clutch Gaming.

Broadcast team

Media coverage
The LCS primarily reaches its viewers through online streaming using its own channels on Twitch and YouTube. On Twitch alone, viewership numbers regularly exceed 200,000 for regular season play, and the games have drawn over 1.7 million unique visitors. However, Riot Games CEO Brandon Beck stated in 2012 that there were no immediate plans to try to bring the LCS to traditional TV, and news coverage of the regular season is generally limited to dedicated electronic sports news sites, such as CBS Interactive's onGamers.

The scale and popularity of the LCS itself, however, has attracted considerable media attention, particularly around some events that legitimised the LCS as a serious competition.

In December 2016, Riot announced that it had reached a deal with BAMTech (a spin-off of MLB Advanced Media) to serve as the exclusive distributor of LCS broadcasts through 2023. BAMTech would have paid $50 million per-year under the contract, and split advertising revenue with Riot. However, internal complications arose after The Walt Disney Company acquired BAMTech, and the contract never actually took effect. As a substitute, Riot entered into an agreement to non-exclusively carry its broadcasts on ESPN+ instead, in addition to existing outlets such as Twitch.

Format
As of 2021, 10 teams from North America compete in the LCS. The LCS begins with the Lock-in kickoff tournament, consisting of a group stage and an eight-team single elimination bracket. The regular season is divided into a double-round robin spring split and a triple-round robin summer split, for a total of 225 games. Teams are ranked by win percentage, with ties split by tiebreaker games if necessary at the end of the regular season. Beginning in 2021, the spring split playoffs were rebranded as the Mid-Season Showdown, retaining the six-team double elimination format.

The previous playoff format featured the top 6 teams of the regular season playing to determine the final standings. The top 2 teams of the regular season receive a bye into the semi-finals, and the remaining 4 teams play each other in the quarter-finals. Each split's playoffs awarded cash prizes and Championship Points, which are used to determine qualification into the annual League of Legends World Championship. The winner of the summer split and the next team with the highest number of Championship Points automatically qualified. The next four teams, as ranked by Championship Point totals, then went on to play the Regional Qualifier tournament to determine the final qualifying team.

The current playoff format introduced in 2020 is a modified double-elimination tournament, with the top six teams seeded into the winners bracket and two additional teams seeded into the losers bracket. The winners bracket is played as a regular knockout tournament, with defeated teams falling to losers bracket. The top teams from the winners and losers brackets play against each other in grand final. The winner of the summer split, along with the runner-up and third-place team, go on to qualify for the annual League of Legends World Championship.

Teams

Past seasons

Number of top four finishes 
<onlyinclude> Denotes a team that has been rebranded or disbanded.

References

 
Esports competitions in the United States
Privately held companies based in California
Recurring sporting events established in 2013
Sports competitions in Los Angeles